KF Ulpiana (Klubi Futbollistik Ulpiana Lipjan) is a professional football club based in Lipjan, Kosovo. The club plays in the first division of football in Kosovo, Football Superleague of Kosovo.

The club plays its home games at the Sami Kelmendi Stadium, which has a capacity of 2,500, it does not meet the criteria of the Union of European Football Associations.

References and notes

External links 
Ulpiana Information and photos about KF Ulpiana and Lipjan.

Ulpiana
Ulpiana